Federico Esposito (born 2 July 1986) is an Italian windsurfer, who specialized in Neil Pryde RS:X class. He was born in Piombino. He represented Italy at the 2012 Summer Olympics, and has been currently training for Fiamma Oro Sport Club under his personal coach and mentor Adriano Stella. As of September 2013, Esposito is ranked no. 45 in the world for the sailboard class by the International Sailing Federation.

Biography
Esposito competed in the men's RS:X class at the 2012 Summer Olympics in London by finishing thirty-sixth and receiving a berth from the ISAF World Championships in Perth, Western Australia. Struggling to attain a top position in the opening series, Esposito accumulated a net score of 269 points to pick up a thirty-fourth spot in a fleet of thirty-eight windsurfers.

References

External links
 
 
  
 

1987 births
Living people
Italian windsurfers
Italian male sailors (sport)
Olympic sailors of Italy
Sailors at the 2012 Summer Olympics – RS:X
People from Piombino
Windsurfers of Fiamme Oro
Sportspeople from the Province of Livorno